The pic de Maupas is a central pyrenean summit, culminating at  on the Franco-Spanish border.

Toponymy 
Maupas means "bad passage" because the passage from the Maupas glacier (today disappeared) and the summit slope is a little awkward.

Geography 
Il is located in Aragon in Spain and Haute-Garonne department (France), above Bagnères-de-Luchon.

Topography 
Il domine le cirque des Crabioules et Superbagnères au nord, le vallon de Remugne au sud.

Geology 
The summit is mainly granitic.

Access 
There are many climbing routes. Access is possible on the eastern ridges (from le pic de Boum) and west (from le col des Crabioules, or by intermediate skying slopes). The standard route lies to the north via the refuge du Maupas, then the pass between la Tusse and le pic du Maupas.

See also 
 List of Pyrenean three-thousanders

References

Mountains of the Pyrenees
Landforms of Haute-Garonne
Mountains of Aragon
Pyrenean three-thousanders